Rees Edgar Tulloss was the 7th President of Wittenberg University.

References

External links
Wittenberg Magazine, Magazine, Wittenberg Alumni, Alumni Magazine, Fall 2003, Alumni, news

Wittenberg University